Moorella humiferrea  is a Gram-positive thermophilic, anaerobic and endospore-forming bacterium from the genus Moorella, which has been isolated from sediments from the Grot geyser, Valley of Geysers, Kamchatka, Russia. This microorganism is able to grow and reduce iron(III) oxide when small amounts of humic acid are available.

References

 

Thermoanaerobacterales
Bacteria described in 2012
Thermophiles
Anaerobes